In traditional Japanese culture,  are small naturally occurring or shaped rocks which are appreciated for their aesthetic or decorative value.  They are similar to Chinese scholar's rocks.

History
Chinese scholar's rocks called gongshi influenced the development of suiseki in Japan.  The history of suiseki in Japan begins during the reign of Empress Suiko.  The small objects were brought to Japan as gifts from the Chinese Imperial court.

Suiseki are usually presented in two different ways:

The stone is provided with a wooden base (daiza).
The stone is placed in a waterproof tray or bowl of ceramic (suiban) or bronze (doban).

These stones are not just any stones which can be found in nature; they must be expressive stones and have a special shape, color and texture to be categorized as suiseki. There is a distinction between landscape and object stones. The former reflect landscapes such as mountains, lakes or rivers, while other stones have object shapes that resemble animals or sculptures.

The stones are of natural origin and are found in rivers, oceans and karst areas. They are not allowed to be reshaped. An exception is the cutting of stones to have a flat base, so they can be placed stably on a daiza, suiban or doban, to be displayed properly. However, this diminishes their value in the eyes of some enthusiasts.

Evaluation
The evaluation of suiseki recognizes subtlety of color, shape, markings and surface.
It is not a silly thing at all to enjoy a stone in a tray. I see the whole world in a tiny stone. Some objects in this world are huge, and others are small, and they come in all shapes, but they are not that different when you look at their essence.
 
Popular types of suiseki suggest a mountain, a waterfall, an island, a thatched hut or an animal.

See also
Chinese scholar's rocks
Suseok in Korea
 Bonseki

References

External links 

 Nippon Suiseki Association
  "Viewing Stones" at National Bonsai Foundation

Arts in Japan
Japanese sculpture
Rock art in Asia
Japanese aesthetics